Saicella is a genus of assassin bugs endemic to Hawaii. There are currently six species in the genus.  Saicella's taxonomic position is uncertain, with characters similar to both the Saicinae and Emesinae subfamilies.

List of species
Saicella kipahulu Polhemus, 2000
Saicella lilinoe Polhemus, 2000
Saicella mulli Polhemus, 2000
Saicella perkinsi Polhemus, 2000
Saicella smithi Usinger, 1958
Saicella usingeri Wygodzinsky, 1966

References

Reduviidae
Insects of Hawaii
Endemic fauna of Hawaii